Štrekljevec is a village in the Municipality of Semič in Slovenia. The area is part of the historical region of Lower Carniola. The municipality is now included in the Southeast Slovenia Statistical Region. 

The local church is dedicated to the Assumption of Mary and belongs to the Parish of Semič. It is a Baroque building dating to the second half of the 18th century.

References

External links

Štrekljevec at Geopedia

Populated places in the Municipality of Semič